Milad Petrušić (20 June 1933 – 22 October 2018) was a Yugoslav hurdler. He competed in the men's 110 metres hurdles at the 1960 Summer Olympics.

References

1933 births
2018 deaths
Athletes (track and field) at the 1960 Summer Olympics
Yugoslav male hurdlers
Bosnia and Herzegovina male athletes
Olympic athletes of Yugoslavia
People from Rogatica